Milkov is a surname. Notable people with this surname include:

 Ivan Milkov Chomakov (born 1953), Bulgarian politician and former mayor of Plovdiv (1999-2007)
 Martin Milkov (born 1999), Bulgarian footballer
 Milan Milkov (born 1996), Macedonian professional basketballer
 Stefan Milkov Ginchev (born 1994), Bulgarian professional footballer

See also
 Malkovich
 Milkov Point, a rocky point on the east side of Lanchester Bay, in the Antarctic Peninsula

Bulgarian-language surnames